YooHoo & Friends is a South Korean line of stuffed toys released by Aurora World around July 2006.

History
Inspired by a bush baby, the first of the YooHoo & Friends toys that were introduced were five and eight-inch plush animals with big button eyes and long, soft tails. The off white color plush animal bodies featured yellow, pink, purple or turquoise colors, primarily around the eyes and as color rings on a solid grey tail. The company expanded the line beginning in July 2007 to include Valentine's and graduation themed YooHoos, eventually leading to the launch of Easter, Halloween and holiday-themed YooHoos. The company continues to expand its merchandising and licensed products worldwide. Other merchandise include educational books, umbrellas, apparel, bedding, room decor and accessories for children, as well as stationery and giftware. Except for the keychain toys, YooHoo & Friends plush animals make sounds when squeezed.

Federal copyright lawsuit
Aurora World, Inc. filed a federal copyright lawsuit against competitor Ty Inc., alleging Ty's Beanie Boos infringe on YooHoo & Friends. Among Aurora's claims: Ty is in violation of the Copyright Act, Lanham Act, section 17200 of the California Business and Professions Code; common law misappropriation; and common law unfair competition. Ty contends it did not intend to sell "Cleo" and "Bubblegum" in the United States. Ty also advised the court that the company had ceased sending out display racks and sell sheets containing images of "Cleo" and "Bubblegum".

Aurora's court documents include comparisons of YooHoo & Friends characters with "Bubblegum" and "Cleo" Beanie Boos. Through its court filings, Aurora says, "Ty's unlawful imitations of the YooHoo & Friends products and blatant infringement are damaging Aurora, not only by causing actual confusion and likelihood of confusion in the marketplace...but also by diminishing the value of the YooHoo & Friends products by diluting their distinct and unique nature and erroneously associating them with Ty rather than Aurora." A pre-trial was scheduled to begin on December 20, 2010.

TV series

2009 TV series

2012 TV series

2019 TV series

Reception
The YooHoo & Friends franchise received several awards from several Korean and International awards. The toys won the Korea Contents Design Award in 2009, received the 2010 Seal of Excellence Award by Creative Child Magazine in the United States and won the Parents' Choice Award. It also ranked 2 in the GiftBeat Survey for Brand Awareness and won the Independent Toy Award in the United Kingdom in 2011. It later got nominated for Best Asian Property in 2013 and won the Tillywig Top Fun award in the US in 2013.

References

External links

2000s toys
Products introduced in 2006
Stuffed toys